The next Senedd election is due to be held in or before May 2026 to elect 60 members to the Senedd (Welsh Parliament). It will be the seventh devolved general election since the Senedd (formerly the National Assembly for Wales) was established in 1999. It will also be the second election since the Senedd changed its name in May 2020.

A reform of the voting system is currently being discussed by the Senedd, with the Government of Wales seeking to implement it for the next election scheduled for 2026.  Election reform for the Senedd has been suggested in multiple directions:
 increasing the size of the Senedd (because of overload),
 changing the voting method (making it more proportional, or simpler to understand)
 enforcing diversity quotas.

Election reform 

Since its establishment in 1999, the Senedd (formerly the Welsh Assembly) has been elected through the additional member system, by which some of the seats (in Wales, 20 out of 60) are attributed regionally (in 5 regions of 4 seats) on the basis of a second vote for a party list, while the other seats are attributed through the customary plurality voting in single-member districts (40 out of 60, the same as those used for Westminster). AMS distributes the seats with the intent of compensating for disproportionalities caused by plurality voting.

Number of members and gender zipping 
The Richard Commission report of 2004 suggested an increase of the number of Members to 80. That number was also suggested, as a minimum, by the 2014 report of the Silk Commission. Similarly, in 2013 and 2016, the Electoral Reform Society published reports making the case for an upsize of the Assembly. A 2017 report of an expert commission led by Laura McAllister suggested an increase to between 80 and 90 Members, switching to single transferable vote (STV) and enforcing gender quotas. There was no cross-party consensus, however, on any of these measures in 2017. The McAllister report successfully pleaded for voting rights to 16 and 17 year-olds.

A reduction in the number of Welsh MPs has been proposed for the next UK general alection. Under the proposals, the number of MPs would be reduced from 40 to 32 and new constituency boundaries have also been proposed. The boundary plans were published on 19 October 2022 and voters have four weeks to comment. The map of the new constituency boundaries would also be used as Senedd regions for the next Senedd election.

After the 2021 Senedd election, the Second Drakeford government entered in a co-operation agreement with Plaid Cymru, entitled "Radical action in testing times". Paragraph 22 asks for: an expansion of the Senedd to between 80 and 100 Members, a more proportional voting method, a simpler one, and one that integrates gender quotas. The paragraph also asks for recommendations to be made by the Special Purpose Committee by 31 May 2022, and aiming to pass legislation in the ensuing 12 to 18 months so that the it can be applied for the next election in 2026.

The Special Committee was set up on 6 October 2021. It was chaired by Huw Irranca-Davies, and composed of five members representing each party, as well as the Llywydd of the Senedd. They held public and private meetings on the issues.

On 10 May 2022, a joint position statement was published by First Minister Mark Drakeford and Plaid Cymru Leader Adam Price, and sent to the Special Committee. In it, they call for a 96-Member Senedd, all elected through closed party list proportional representation (using the D'Hondt method) with mandatory "zipping" of male and female candidates in the list to ensure that for every party, half of the Members will be women (unlike the voluntary all-women shortlists used by the Labour Party). The elections would be organised in 16 six-member regions created by pairing up the 32 redrawn Westminster constituencies.

The final report of the Special Committee was published on 30 May 2022 and recommends the system agreed to by the Labour and Plaid Cymru leaders. Although the Expert Panel preferred the single transferable vote to any other method, the closed list PR system was favored by the Committee over its capacity to enforce gender quotas through mandatory zipping. The Senedd's legislative competence in the area, however, isn't fully known and may be subject to a legal challenge.

The report was discussed in plenary session on 8 June 2022, and approved 40–15.

Further changes 
In February 2023, plans for additional reform included:

 Candidates must be resident in Wales

 A defection of an MS to another party is not permitted. An MS would instead have to become an independent.

 Independent candidates must disclose any party membership

Opposition to reform 
The Welsh Conservatives have continuously opposed the Senedd's expansion plan, which they fear would be costly, and have called for a referendum arguing that only a public mandate can give legitimacy to such a reform. The sentiment was also expressed by Welsh Secretary Simon Hart. His deputy David TC Davies told his party conference that the reform plan would "lock in a Labour government forever" and "concentrate power in the hands of a few party managers".

On 10 May 2022, MS Darren Millar, representing the Conservative Party in the Committee, resigned in disagreement to the Drakeford-Price joint statement, calling the media statement "discourteous to the Welsh Parliament" and accusing the leaders of "trying to strongarm the committee".

Opinion polling

Constituency vote

Regional vote

See also
 Next Scottish Parliament election
 Next Northern Ireland Assembly election
 Next United Kingdom general election in Wales
 Next United Kingdom general election

References

External links
 Next Senedd election

2020s elections in Wales
General elections to the Senedd
Future elections in the United Kingdom
Senedd election